Filip Hlohovský (born 13 June 1988) is a Slovak football winger for Baník Prievidza.

Club career
Hlhovský was born in Handlová. Filip started his career in Prievidza, later was transferred to AS Trenčín. On 28 May 2012, he signed a four-year contract with ŠK Slovan Bratislava.

International career
Hlohovský was first called up to the senior national team for two unofficial friendly fixtures held in Abu Dhabi, UAE, in January 2017, against Uganda and Sweden. He capped his debut against Uganda, being fielded from the start and playing the entire match. Slovakia went on to lose the game 1–3. He also played the first half of the 0–6 loss to Sweden, when he was substituted by Patrik Mišák. Hlohovský failed to score from the penalty kick in the 30th minute of the match, when the score was 0–1. Being the top scorer of Fortuna Liga at the time, he somewhat failed to meet public expectations.

Career statistics

Honours

Club
MŠK Žilina
Fortuna Liga: Winners: 2016-17

Individual
 Fortuna Liga Player of the year 2015-16

References

External links
Slovan Bratislava profile
AS Trenčín profile

1988 births
Living people
Slovak footballers
People from Handlová
Sportspeople from the Trenčín Region
Slovakia youth international footballers
Slovakia under-21 international footballers
Slovakia international footballers
Association football forwards
AS Trenčín players
ŠK Slovan Bratislava players
FK Senica players
MŠK Žilina players
Seongnam FC players
Daejeon Hana Citizen FC players
FK Železiarne Podbrezová players
FC Baník Prievidza players
Slovak Super Liga players
K League 2 players
2. Liga (Slovakia) players
4. Liga (Slovakia) players
Expatriate footballers in South Korea
Slovak expatriate sportspeople in South Korea